Sean Quinn (born May 10, 2000) is an American professional road cyclist, who currently rides for UCI WorldTeam .

Major results

2017
 5th Overall Tour du Pays de Vaud
1st  Young rider classification
 8th Overall Tour de l'Abitibi
2018
 3rd Road race, National Junior Road Championships
 6th Overall Tour de l'Abitibi
 7th Overall Course de la Paix Juniors
 7th Overall Tour du Pays de Vaud
 9th Overall Saarland Trofeo
 10th Road race, UCI Junior Road World Championships
2019
 1st Stage 1 (ITT) Redlands Bicycle Classic
 6th Overall Giro Ciclistico d'Italia
2021
 1st Classica da Arrábida
 1st  Young rider classification, Volta ao Algarve
 8th Overall Tour de Wallonie
2023
 10th Cadel Evans Great Ocean Road Race

References

External links

2000 births
Living people
American male cyclists
Cyclists from Los Angeles